Plexin domain-containing protein 1 is a protein that in humans is encoded by the PLXDC1 gene.

References

Further reading